Snævar Darri Ingólfsson (born 22 December 1979) is an Icelandic actor. He is best known for his performance as Oliver Saxon in the TV series Dexter. He studied drama in London and played one of the main roles in the Icelandic film Borgríki 2. In 2018, he appeared on the Alice in Chains' music video "Never Fade".

Personal life
Darri is married and has two children, Nolan and Kara.

Filmography

Film

Television

References

External links 

1979 births
Living people
Darri Ingolfsson